Quitilipi is a city in Chaco Province, Argentina. It is the head town of the Quitilipi Department.

External links

Populated places in Chaco Province
Populated places established in 1912
1912 establishments in Argentina